Manuel Bandera (born 12 December 1960) is a Spanish actor and dancer. He became popular for his performance in the 1989 film The Things of Love.

Biography 
Born on 12 December in 1960 in Málaga, Bandera started his career performing as dancer in the game show Un, dos, tres... responda otra vez. 

He landed a breakthrough role with his performance in the Jaime Chávarri's film Cosas del querer (1989), which garnered him public recognition. She played Mario, a homosexual artist victim of the Francoist repression, inspired by the real-life . He performed minor roles in the Pedro Almodóvar's films Átame and Kika. Bandera starred in the lead role of Boabdil in the television miniseries Réquiem por Granada.

He has performed several main cast roles in soap operas, including El súper, Amar en tiempos revueltos, Bandolera and Acacias 38. At present (2021-2022), he is playing a main character in "A Chorus Line" promoted by Antonio Banderas.

Filmography 

Television

Film

References 

1960 births
20th-century Spanish male actors
Spanish male television actors
Spanish male film actors
Spanish male dancers
Male actors from Andalusia
21st-century Spanish male actors
Living people